Megaphyllum may refer to:
 Megaphyllum (millipede), a genus of myriapods in the family Julidae
 Megaphyllum, a genus of flowering plants in the family Rubiaceae; synonym of Pentagonia 
 Megaphyllum, a genus of cnidarians with unknown classification, described by Soshkina, 1939